J. William Smith (October 31, 1868 – August 8, 1937) was a Canadian politician. He served in the Legislative Assembly of New Brunswick as member of the Conservative party representing Kings County from 1925 to 1935.

References

20th-century Canadian politicians
1868 births
1937 deaths
Progressive Conservative Party of New Brunswick MLAs
People from Kings County, New Brunswick